Scuderia Finotto was a motor racing team from Italy, founded by Jürg Dubler. It raced in Formula One in 1974, using customer Brabham cars.

Formula One
For the  season, Martino Finotto bought two Brabham BT42s, and leased both cars to the Swiss Jürg Dubler, a retired racing driver. Jürg Dubler entered both cars for the 1974 Spanish Grand Prix sponsored by Silvio Moser's backer Bretscher, one for Silvio Moser and the other for the Swede Reine Wisell, but one week before that race Moser was seriously injured during a sportscar race at Monza and died four weeks later. The team had only one full-time mechanic, New Zealander John R.Anderson, and an engine builder, Englishman R.John Leslie, and used Lino Branca's workshop in Buscate and Novamotor's engine dyno. The team had no spare parts for the cars so often had to rob parts from one car to keep the other running. Dubler bought one new Cosworth DFV but this destroyed itself during testing before the French GP. The other two engines supplied by Brabham with the cars were old small port engines that were less powerful and unreliable.

Gérard Larrousse first drove for the team in Belgium. He qualified 28th and retired on lap 53 because of tyre problems. Larrousse also tried to qualify in France but failed to do so. Helmuth Koinigg drove for the team in Austria but failed to qualify. The last outing for Scuderia Finotto came in Italy when Carlo Facetti failed to qualify. Cees Siewertsen tested for Scuderia Finotto at the Casale circuit in Milan with the possibility of participation at the Dutch GP. Manfred Mohr and Andy Sutcliffe were associated with participation in the Grands Prix of Germany and Great Britain, but the team never arrived. The same happened for Jean-Louis Lafosse who had been initially entered for the Italian GP.

Complete Formula One World Championship results
(key) (Results in bold indicate pole position; results in italics indicate fastest lap.) 

Formula One entrants
Italian auto racing teams